Richard Williams may refer to:

Entertainment 

 Richard Williams (animator) (1933–2019), Canadian-British animator
 Richard Williams (theatre director), theatre director, producer and teacher
 Dick Anthony Williams (1934–2012), American actor
 Richard Bebb (Richard Bebb Williams, 1927–2006), English actor

Military 

 Richard Williams (Royal Marines officer) (1764–1839), British military officer
 Richard Williams (RAAF officer) (1890–1980), Australian aviator

Music 

 Richard Williams (conductor) (1923–2007), Welsh conductor
 Richard Williams (musician) (1931–1985), American jazz trumpeter
 Richard Williams, drummer for The Passions
 Dick Williams (singer) (1926–2018), American singer
 Rich Williams (born 1950), American guitarist

Politics 

 Richard Williams (alias Cromwell) (by 1502–1545), Welsh soldier and courtier
 Richard Williams (congressman) (1836–1914), American politician from Oregon
 Richard Williams (died 1579) (before 1535–1579), English politician for Oxford
 Richard Williams (died 1601) (before 1560–1601), MP for New Romney
 Richard Williams (died 1692) (c. 1654–1692), MP for Radnorshire, for Breconshire and for New Radnor Boroughs
 Richard Williams (MP for Flint) (c. 1699–1759), Welsh politician for Flint
 Richard Williams (of Rhosygeido) (before 1570–1622), Welsh politician from Anglesey
 Richard H. Williams (New York politician) (1807–?), American politician from New York
 Richard Henry Williams (1852–1924), Canadian lumber merchant and political figure in Saskatchewan
 Richard S. Williams (before 1820–after 1853), American politician from New York

Sports

Baseball 

 Dick Williams (1929–2011), American baseball player and manager
 Dick Williams (executive), American baseball executive
 Rick Williams (baseball, born 1952), American baseball pitcher (Houston Astros, 1978–79)
 Rick Williams (baseball, born 1956), American baseball coach and scout

Basketball 

 Richard Williams (basketball coach), American basketball coach at Mississippi State University from 1986 to 1998
 Richie Williams (basketball) (born 1987), American basketball player

Cricket 

 Richard Williams (cricketer, born 1901) (1901–1982), English, played for Worcestershire
 Richard Williams (cricketer, born 1957), Welsh-born, played for Northamptonshire
 Reggie Williams (cricketer) (Richard Charles James Williams, born 1969), English, played for Gloucestershire

Football 

 Richard Williams (American football) (born 1960), American running back for Atlanta Falcons and Houston Oilers
 Richard Williams (Australian rules footballer) (1905–1958)
 Richard Williams (English footballer) (1869–after 1895), English, played for Everton and Luton Town
 Richard L. Williams (soccer), Canadian soccer player
 Richard Parry Williams (1863–?), Welsh international footballer
 Dick Williams (footballer) (1905–1983), English footballer
 Richie Williams (born 1970), American soccer coach and former player
 Richie Williams (Canadian football) (born 1983), American quarterback who played in Canada

Rugby 

 Richard Williams (rugby league) (born 1986), Australian rugby league footballer
 Richard Garnons Williams (1856–1915), Welsh rugby union player
 Dickie Williams (1925–1997), Welsh rugby union and rugby league footballer

Tennis

 Richard Williams (tennis coach) (born 1942), American coach and father of Venus and Serena Williams
 R. Norris Williams (1891–1968), American player

Other sports 

 Richard Williams (boxer) (born 1971), English boxer
 Richard Williams (racing driver) (born 1977), English racing driver
 Richard Williams (rock climber), American climber and entrepreneur

Writers and academics 

 Richard Williams (academic) (born 1960), English academic and engineer
 Richard Williams (journalist) (born 1947), English journalist
 Richard Allen Williams (born 1936), African American physician and author
 Richard Bryn Williams (1902–1981), Welsh writer, poet, playwright and historian
 Richard D'Alton Williams (1822–1862), Irish physician and poet
 Richard Hughes Williams (1878–1919), Welsh language writer of short stories
 Richard Tecwyn Williams (1909–1979), Welsh biochemist

Others 

 Richard Leroy Williams (1923–2011), American judge
 Richard Llewellyn Williams (born 1929), American diplomat
 Richard Mackenzie Williams, Welsh Anglican priest
 Richard T. Williams (before 1930–1956), American sailor, for whom Williams Field in Antarctica is named

See also 

 Dick Williams (disambiguation)
 Richie Williams (disambiguation)
 Ricky Williams (disambiguation)
 Ricardo Williams (disambiguation)
 Williams (surname)